Mabuti Potloane (born 15 January 1986) is a Mosotho professional footballer who plays as a midfielder.

International career

International goals
Scores and results list Lesotho's goal tally first.

References

External links 
 

1986 births
Living people
Lesotho footballers
Association football midfielders
Lesotho international footballers